Robert Wason may refer to:
 Robert Wason (Maryland politician), member of the Maryland Senate, 1838–1840
 Robert Wason Jr., member of the Wisconsin Legislature, 1849
 Robert Alexander Wason (1874–1955), American writer